Kamf ('Struggle') was a Yiddish language daily newspaper published from Riga, Latvia 1940-1941. It was an organ of the Riga Committee of the Communist Party (Bolsheviks) of Latvia. The first issue of Kamf was published on July 1, 1940.

H. Margolis was the editor of the newspaper. Veteran journalist  was key organizer of the publication. Kamf was intended to have a readership in Jewish communities in all of Latvia. It had an evening edition twice a week. Initially standard Yiddish spelling with Hebrew vocabulary in original shape was used. On July 13, 1940 Kamf began including a weekly youth supplement, which used Yiddishist spellings consistent with Soviet practice.

In October 1940 the circle around Kamf launched the political-literary journal Ufboj. The last issue of Kamf was published on January 12, 1941, the day of the by-election of Latvian delegates to the Supreme Soviet of the Soviet Union. A total of 168 issues of Kamf were published. Ufboj came to replace Kamf as the Communist Party Yiddish-language newspaper.

References

Mass media in Riga
Newspapers established in 1940
Publications disestablished in 1941
Secular Jewish culture in Europe
Yiddish communist newspapers
Defunct newspapers published in Latvia
1940 establishments in Latvia
1941 disestablishments in Latvia